David Barber may refer to:

 David G. Barber (1960–2022), Canadian scientist and academic 
 David Barber (cricketer) (born 1937), English cricketer
 Dave Barber (1955–2015), American radio and television personality